Azerbaijan is a multicultural and multi-religious country and a secular country. The article 48 of The Constitution of Azerbaijan states that the right to liberty and the right of people of all faiths may choose and practice their religion without restriction is ensured. Article 18 of the Constitution of Azerbaijan states that religion acts separately from the state affairs and the government. People of all beliefs are equal before the law and the propaganda of any religion, including Islam, while majority of the population is Muslim, is still prohibited strictly as a case of contradicting humanism.

Religious demography

There were no reliable statistics on membership in specific religious groups; however, according to official figures approximately 96 percent of the population is Muslim. The remainder of the population consists mostly of Russian Orthodox, Armenian Apostolic (Almost all of which live in the break-away region of Nagorno-Karabakh), Jews, and nonbelievers. Among the Muslim majority, religious observance is relatively low, and Muslim identity tends to be based more on culture and ethnicity than religion. According to the State Committee on Work with Religious Associations (SCWRA), the Muslim population is approximately 65 percent Shia and 35 percent Sunni; traditionally, differences are not defined sharply. In a 2016 report, the United States Department of State puts the number as 65 percent Shia and 35 percent Sunni for the year 2011.

The vast majority of Christians are Russian Orthodox. According to the U.S. Department of State, their "identity, like that of Muslims, tends to be based as much on culture and ethnicity as religion". Christians were concentrated in the urban areas of Baku, which is the nation's capital, and Sumgayit, its third-largest city.

Of a total Jewish population of approximately 15,000, the vast majority live in Baku. Much smaller communities exist in Guba in village and municipality named Red Town and elsewhere. There are five to six rabbis and six synagogues in the country.

Shi'a, Sunni, Russian Orthodox, and Jews are considered to be the country's "traditional" religious groups. Small congregations of Lutherans, Roman Catholics, Baptists, Molokans (Old Believers), Seventh-day Adventists, and followers of the Baháʼí Faith have been present for over 100 years.

In the last decade, a number of religious groups considered foreign or "nontraditional" have established a presence, including "Wahhabi" and Salafist Muslims, Pentecostal and evangelical Christians, Jehovah's Witnesses, and Hare Krishnas.

There were significant expatriate Christian and Muslim communities in Baku; authorities generally permitted these groups to worship freely.

Status of religious freedom

Legal and policy framework
The Constitution provides that persons of all faiths may choose and practice their religion without restriction. Under the Constitution each person has the right to choose and change his or her own religious affiliation and belief (including atheism), to join or establish the religious group of his or her choice, and to practice his or her religion. The law on religious freedom expressly prohibits the Government from interfering in the religious activities of any individual or group; however, there are exceptions, including cases where the activity of a religious group "threatens public order and stability".

A number of legal provisions enable the Government to regulate religious groups, The requirement for religious organizations in Azerbaijan to register through SCWRA is according to the law accepted on June 21, 2001. After Amendments to the Law on Freedom of Religion was adopted (8 May 2009), registration process was modified and already registered organizations had to register again through SCWRA this time. This process enables SCWRA to monitor the registration process; and if necessary, appeal to the courts to discontinue activities of religions groups. Registration is processed based on the location as mentioned in the application. When there is any change in the location of the organization, it should be reported to SCWRA and appropriate modifications should be made in registration process. After registering through SCWRA, religious groups obtain rights to function as a legal entity, have a bank account and rent a possession. The organizations, which were unsuccessful to register may be proclaimed as illegal and prohibited to function.

Since 2001 religious groups must register with the SCWRA. The SCWRA has broad powers over registration and the publication, import, and distribution of religious literature, and it may suspend the activities of religious groups who violate the law.

Some religious groups experienced difficulties with disapproval of registration according to the International Religious Freedom Report 2015, applications are denied according to the legislation. When all necessary documents organized appropriately are presented to the responsible entity, registration is accomplished. If the actions, objects or instructions of the religious groups oppose the legislation of Azerbaijan, or its charter and other documents are in contrast with the laws, or they contain false information, then registration of those groups can be refused by responsible authorities. Religious groups have rights to appeal the disapproval of registration to the courts.

According to the SCWRA, it registered 48 new groups from May 2006 through June 2007 and did not reject any applications. All of the newly registered groups were Muslim communities. The SCWRA reported 392 total registered religious communities in the country.

Under the law on religious freedom, political parties cannot engage in religious activity, and religious leaders are forbidden from seeking public office. Religious facilities may not be used for political purposes.

The law on religious freedom, which the Government enforces, prohibits foreigners from proselytizing.

Registered Muslim organizations are subordinate to the Caucasian Muslim Board (CMB), a Soviet-era muftiate that appoints Muslim clerics to mosques, periodically monitors sermons, and organizes annual pilgrimages to Mecca. Muslim religious groups must receive a letter of approval from the CMB before they can be registered by the SCWRA. Some Muslim religious leaders objected to interference from both the CMB and the SCWRA.

Religious instruction is not mandatory, and there is no religious curriculum for public elementary and high schools; however, there is no restriction on teaching religion in public schools.

Restrictions on religious freedom
Of the five main Baptist churches, three have successfully registered; however, during the reporting period the SCWRA again rejected the applications of the Baptist churches in Aliabad (which has sought registration for 15 years) and Neftçala. Baptists stated the Aliabad notary refused to review the community's registration documents.

In December 2006 SCWRA officials reportedly told the Assembly of God community in Baku that it would have to give the SCWRA advance notice of meetings in order to be registered. The Assemblies of God reported that they tried to register their churches in Baku and Sumgayit several times—most recently in January 2007—but did not receive a response from the SCWRA. An Assembly of God representative met with SCWRA officials in May and June 2007 to advance the registration process, but the SCWRA said that it was still examining the application. In June police also interfered in one of the church's gatherings in Baku.

The Juma Mosque has remained closed since June 2004; the mosque's imam was still not allowed to travel abroad at the end of the reporting period.

In May 2007 SCWRA head Hidayat Orujov stated that only 9 of 49 mosques in Guba were registered. Local commentators reported that Salafists were particularly active in the country's northern regions of Guba and Kachmaz.

The law on religious freedom expressly prohibits religious proselytizing by foreigners, and the Government strictly enforced this. The Government was concerned about Islamic missionary groups (predominantly Iranian and Wahhabi) operating in the country and, as in previous years, restricted their activities.

Some Muslims complained about the SCWRA's allegedly indiscriminate use of the term "Wahhabi" to cast a shadow on devout Muslims. Local Protestant Christians also claimed that SCWRA Chairman Orujov derogatorily referred to their organizations as "sects."

In May 2007 a Baku court sentenced a journalist and the editor of the Sanat newspaper on charges of "inciting religious hatred." The journalist was given a 3-year prison term, and the editor was given a 4-year term. The journalist had written an article, published in November 2006, arguing Islamic values retarded the country's development.

The law permits the production and dissemination of religious literature with the approval of the SCWRA; only religious literature, which promote religious intolerance, discrimination and radical religious ideas are restricted to import to the country by SCWRA.

The Government regulates travel for the purpose of religious training. Prospective travelers must obtain permission from, or register with, the SCWRA or the Ministry of Education to go abroad for religious studies.

No religious identification is required in passports or other identity documents. However, the Center for the Protection of Conscience and Religious Freedom reported that authorities prohibited Muslim women from wearing headscarves in passport photos and other official identity documents.

Some local officials continued to discourage Muslim women from wearing headscarves in schools.

The official website of Jehovah's Witnesses reported on March 23, 2015 that "religious intolerance is escalating in Azerbaijan as law-enforcement authorities impose heavy fines on Jehovah's Witnesses and imprison them." It added: "Authorities are criminally prosecuting the Witnesses for meeting together for worship and for talking to others about their beliefs."

Press reports indicated that the Armenian Apostolic Church enjoyed a special status in the Nagorno-Karabakh region. The largely Muslim, ethnic Azerbaijani population in Nagorno-Karabakh and the seven occupied territories had fled the region during the conflict with Armenia in the 1990s and remained unable to return to these areas.

During the reporting period, there were several incidents of police arresting Wahhabis and sometimes confiscating weapons and literature, particularly in the northern regions of Guba, Khachmaz, Gax, and Zaqatala, according to local contacts and the press. In April 2007, for example, police detained 16 alleged radical Salafists in Khachmaz.

In 2019, the United States Commission on International Religious Freedom reported the arrest of 77 individuals labelled as "Shia extremists", of which 48 were considered political prisoners by human rights defenders, they also reported that in court hearings throughout the year, these individuals testified that police and other officials tortured them to coerce false confessions. Local human rights groups and others stated the government continued to physically abuse, arrest, and imprison religious activists. Authorities briefly detained, fined, or warned individuals for holding unauthorized religious meetings; as the government’s requirements for legal registration were unachievable for communities with less than 50 members. The government controls the importation, distribution, and sale of religious materials. The courts fined individuals for the unauthorized sale or distribution of religious materials.

Civil society representatives stated citizens continued to tolerate “traditional” minority religious groups (i.e., those historically present in the country), including Jews, Russian Orthodox, and Catholics; however, groups viewed as “nontraditional” were often viewed with suspicion and mistrust.

Anti-Semitism
Antisemitism is one form of national intolerance, expressed as a hostile attitude towards Jews as an ethnic or religious group. Antisemitism is not observed in Azerbaijan. Over the centuries, different ethnic and linguistic groups of Jews lived on the territory of Azerbaijan: Mountain Jews, Ashkenazi Jews, Krymchaks, Kurdish Jews, and Georgian Jews. In the 19th century majority of the Jewish population of Azerbaijan were mountain Jews, in the 20th century the majority were Ashkenazi.

The main Jewish center was the city of Guba, where in 1835 were 5492 Jews (of whom 2718 people concentrated in the Jewish quarter); In 1866 in the city lived 6282 Jews. Comparatively large communities of Mountain Jews were also present in the villages of Vartashen and Mudji. In 1864, in the village of Vartashen (since 1990 - Oguz), the majority of the population were Jews. In 1886 there lived 1400 Jews, there were three prayer houses, two Talmud-Huns with 40 pupils. It is known that the total number of literate who can read the Torah, was 70 people, among them there were five Jews who were called rabbis. In 1917 the weekly "Kavkazer Vochenblat" (in Yiddish) was published in Baku, in 1917-1918 - the weekly "Caucasian Jewish Herald" with the application "Palestine". In 1919 the newspaper "Tobushi sabhi" (in the Hebrew-Tatar language) was issued for some time. With the final establishment of Soviet power (April 1920), the independent Jewish press ceased to exist. Since 1922, the newspaper Korsokh was published in the capital of Azerbaijan in the Hebrew-Tatar language - the organ of the Caucasian Committee of the Jewish Communist Party and its youth organization. In the 1990s, there were two synagogues in Baku (mountain Jews and Ashkenazi), as well as synagogues of mountain Jews in Guba and Oguz and a synagogue of gays in Privolnoye. In September 1993, a seminar of rabbis of Azerbaijan, Georgia and Dagestan was held in Baku. In 1994, a yeshiva was opened there. In 1997, a synagogue of Georgian Jews was opened in Baku. In the early 2000s. In the suburbs of Guba, the Red Sloboda, there were three synagogues of Mountain Jews, and the yeshiva operated. Since 1999, a religious Jewish high school has been working in Baku. According to 1994 data, Hebrew was taught at the university and in two high schools in the capital. Hebrew courses were conducted in Baku, Guba and Oguz. Representatives of the Jewish Agency and teachers from Israel provided great assistance in organizing classes; Among the students of the courses there were also non-Jews. In front of the audience were a Jewish ensemble of chamber music, a children's choir, a dance ensemble. Local radio and television regularly broadcast records of Israeli pop music.

The leadership of Azerbaijan seeks to establish political and economic ties with Israel. Diplomatic relations were established in 1993. On 11 May 1994, the Chargé d'affaires of the State of Israel in Azerbaijan, Eliezer Yotvat, presented his credentials to President Heydar Aliyev. In August 1999, the Israeli parliamentary delegation paid an official visit to Azerbaijan. The volume of exports from Israel to Azerbaijan in 1993 amounted to 545 thousand dollars, imports - twelve thousand; In 1994, exports and imports increased significantly.

Improvements and Positive Developments in Respect for Religious Freedom
Some religious groups in the country reported improvements in their ability to function freely. Several churches indicated that they received or expected to receive their registration, were able to import religious literature, and met without government interference.

The Government promotes interfaith understanding. The SCWRA convened leaders of various religious communities on several occasions to resolve disputes in private and provided forums for visiting officials to discuss religious issues with religious figures. The SCWRA organizes several seminars, conferences, and regional meetings on religious freedom and tolerance regularly. On 26–27 April 2007 Azerbaijan hosted the international conference on the “Role of Media in Development of Tolerance and Mutual Understanding" as a member of the Organization of Islamic Conference.

In May 2007 construction began on a new Jewish educational complex. Authorities also reserved one wing of a Baku school for secular and religious classes for 200 Jewish students.

Azerbaijani Government allocates financial support to different religious groups continuously. The latest allocation was determined among Caucasian Muslims Office, Archbishop of Baku and Azerbaijan of the Russian Orthodox Church, Community of Mountain Jews in Baku, Community of European Jews in Baku, Apostolic prefecture of the Roman Catholic Church in Azerbaijan and Alban-Udi Christian community from the 2018 Presidential Reserve Fund according to Presidential Decree dated 11 June 2018.

Inter-religious activities 
The Government of Azerbaijan promotes religious tolerance by organizing inter-religious events, financially supporting workshops relating to this issue. A number of regional conferences have been organized by the government in order to stimulated religious tolerance and fight against religious radicalism. Azerbaijan hosted 7th Global Forum of the United Nations Alliance of Civilizations.

Pope Francis visited Azerbaijan in October 2016 and expressed his positive opinions publicly on interfaith dialogue and religious tolerance in the country.

SCWRA organizes conferences, dialogues, public events, trainings and seminars relating to religious issues with the participation of representatives of different faiths. The Eurasian Regional Center of Islamic Conference Youth Forum is one of the organizations that support these kinds of activities along with SCWRA.

An international conference on ‘Islamic Solidarity – A Challenge of Time’ organized by Caucasus Muslim Board, SCWRA, Baku International Center of Multiculturalism and National Academy of Science of Azerbaijan took place on March 15, 2017 in Baku.

The seminar on “Multiculturalism and Inter-religious Tolerance: The Experience of Azerbaijan and its Significance for Europe” was organized by ISDP, the Baku International Multiculturalism Center and the Embassy of Azerbaijan in Sweden on November 18, 2015.

No matter there is an ongoing conflict between Armenia and Azerbaijan, religious and ethnic tolerance is promoted in Azerbaijan. Therefore, Catholicos of all Armenians Karekin II visited Baku to take part at the World religious Leaders Summit. He has also been to Armenian Church in the center of Baku during his visit. This event has a historic significance, as it was the first time an Armenian religious leader visited Baku after territories of Azerbaijan was occupied.

Summit of World Religious Leaders was held in Baku on June 1, 2010 initiated by the Board of Caucasus Muslims and organized by Inter-Religious Council of the CIS. Representatives of Buddhist, Christian, Jewish and Muslim groups, as well as international organizations took part in the event, including Kirill I, Patriarch of Moscow and all Rus’, and Karekin II, the Catholicos of All Armenians. In the end of the conference, a final declaration was signed inviting religious leaders to broaden their activities in promoting peace and discarding radicalism, extremist ideologies, aggressive separatism, and terrorism.

Societal abuses and discrimination
There were some reports of societal abuses or discrimination based on religious belief or practice. There was popular prejudice against Muslims who convert to other faiths and hostility toward groups that proselytize, particularly evangelical Christian and other missionary groups. This was accentuated by the unresolved conflict over Nagorno-Karabakh.

Hostility between Armenians and Azerbaijanis, intensified by the Nagorno-Karabakh conflict, remained strong. In those areas of the country controlled by Armenians, all ethnic Azerbaijanis have fled, and the mosques that had not been destroyed remained inactive. Animosity toward ethnic Armenians elsewhere in the country forced most of them to flee between 1988 and 1990, and all Armenian churches, many of which were damaged in ethnic riots that took place more than a decade ago, remained closed. As a consequence, the estimated 10,000 to 30,000 ethnic Armenians who briefly remained were unable to attend services in their traditional places of worship and had to hide their identity. Due to the lack of physical safety, almost all of the remaining Armenians also later fled.

At the end of the reporting period, Jehovah's Witnesses in Baku reported being unable to use a building they had rented for the purpose of religious meetings since signing a rental agreement in September 2006. According to Jehovah's Witnesses, local residents hired private security guards to prevent their access to the property on September 21, 2006, and local police informed the group on September 24 that they would not be able to hold meetings in the space due to residents' complaints. On April 17, 2007, four men reportedly broke into the building and attacked two Jehovah's Witnesses and property inside. The group reported that local police refused to investigate the incident despite the attackers being identified.

As in previous reporting periods, newspapers and television broadcasts depicted "nontraditional" religious groups as threats to the identity of the nation and as undermining the country's traditions of interfaith harmony, which led to local harassment.

During the reporting period, articles critical of Wahhabism and of Christian missionaries appeared in newspapers, and one television channel aired "exposes" of Christian church services.

Hostility also existed toward foreign (mostly Iranian) Muslim missionary activity, which many viewed as attempts to spread political Islam, and therefore as a threat to stability and peace. The media targeted some Muslim communities that the Government claimed were involved in illegal activities.

On April 11, 2007, unidentified individuals threw a burning object through the window of a newly constructed Roman Catholic church in Baku. The church's priest publicly stated that the incident was almost certainly criminal and thanked local authorities for investigating the matter.

Suppression of Shia religiosity
Despite being Shia majority country, the ruling regime of Ilham Aliyev regularly and aggressively  enforces secularism; Azerbaijanis are forbidden to study in foreign hawzas, Azeri women are discouraged and forbidden from mandatory Islamic veiling, alcohol such as beer and wine are domestically produced and regularly consumed, yearly Ashura commemorations are scrutinised and often banned.

See also
Religion in Azerbaijan
Human rights in Azerbaijan
State Committee for Work with Religious Organizations of Azerbaijan Republic

References

 United States Bureau of Democracy, Human Rights and Labor. Azerbaijan: International Religious Freedom Report 2007. This article incorporates text from this source, which is in the public domain.
 Forum 18 Religious Freedom Survey, September 2008
 Article on Forum18 .

Azerbaijan
Human rights in Azerbaijan
Religion in Azerbaijan